The Brooklyn Dodgers were a Major League Baseball team founded in 1883 as the Brooklyn Grays, next year in 1884 becoming a member of the American Association as the Brooklyn Atlantics before joining the National League in 1890. They remained in Brooklyn until 1957, after which the club moved to Los Angeles, California, where it continues its history as the Los Angeles Dodgers. The team moved west at the same time as its longtime rival, the New York Giants, moved to San Francisco in northern California as the San Francisco Giants.

The team's name derived from the reputed skill of Brooklyn residents at evading the city's trolley streetcars. The name is a shortened form of their old name, the Brooklyn Trolley Dodgers. The Dodgers played in two stadiums in South Brooklyn, each named Washington Park, and at Eastern Park in the neighborhood of Brownsville before moving to Ebbets Field in the neighborhood of Crown Heights in 1912. The team is noted for signing Jackie Robinson in 1947 as the first black player in the modern major leagues.

Early Brooklyn baseball
Many of the clubs represented at the first convention of the National Association of Base Ball Players (NABBP) were from Brooklyn, including the Atlantic, Eckford, and Excelsior clubs that combined to dominate play for most of the 1860s. Brooklyn helped make baseball commercial, as the locale of the first paid admission games, a series of three all star contests matching New York and Brooklyn in 1858. Brooklyn also featured the first two enclosed baseball grounds, the Union Grounds and the Capitoline Grounds; enclosed, dedicated ballparks accelerated the evolution from amateurism to professionalism.

Despite the early success of Brooklyn clubs in the NABBP, which were officially amateur until 1869, they fielded weak teams in the succeeding National Association of Professional Base Ball Players (NAPBBP), the first professional league formed in 1871. The Excelsiors no longer challenged for the amateur championship after the Civil War (1861–1865) and never entered the professional NAPBBP (aka NA). The Eckfords and Atlantics declined to join until 1872 and thereby lost their best players; the Eckfords survived only one season and the Atlantics four, with losing teams.

The National League (NL) replaced the NAPBBP in 1876 and granted exclusive territories to its eight members, excluding the Atlantics in favor of the Mutual Club of New York who had shared home grounds with the Atlantics. When the Mutuals were expelled by the league, the Hartford club moved in, the press dubbing them The Brooklyn Hartfords, and played its home games at Union Grounds in 1877 before disbanding.

The origin of the Dodgers

The team currently known as the Dodgers was formed in 1883 by real estate magnate and baseball enthusiast Charles Byrne, who convinced his brother-in-law Joseph Doyle and casino operator Ferdinand Abell to start the team with him. Byrne arranged to build a grandstand on a lot bounded by Third Street, Fourth Avenue, Fifth Street, and Fifth Avenue, and named it Washington Park in honor of first president George Washington. 

Nicknamed by reporters the "Grays" for their uniforms, the team played in the minor level Inter-State Association of Professional Baseball Clubs that first season. Doyle became the first team manager, and they drew 6,431 fans to their first home game on May 12, 1883, against the Trenton, New Jersey team. The Grays won the league title after the Camden Merritt club in New Jersey disbanded on July 20 and Brooklyn picked up some of its better players. The Grays were invited to join the two-year-old professional circuit, the American Association (founded 1882) to compete with the eight-year-old NL for the 1884 season.

After winning the American Association league championship in 1889, the Brooklyn club (very occasionally now nicknamed the Bridegrooms or Grooms, for six players having wed during the 1888 season) moved to the competing older National League (1876) and won the 1890 NL Championship, being the only Major League team to win consecutive championships in both professional "base ball" leagues. They lost the 1889 championship tournament to the New York Giants and tied the 1890 championship with Louisville. Their success during this period was partly attributed to their having absorbed skilled players from the defunct AA New York Metropolitans and one-year Players League entry the Brooklyn Ward's Wonders. The middle years of the decade were disappointing, a slump the Spalding Guide rather primly ascribed to management tolerating drunkenness among the players. 

In 1899, most of the original old Baltimore Orioles NL stars from the legendary Maryland club which earlier won three consecutive championships in 1894–1895–1896, were moved to the Grays (Bridegrooms) 
by the ownership partner in both teams, Harry Von der Horst, along with famed Orioles manager Ned Hanlon who became the club's new manager in New York / Brooklyn under majority owner Charles Ebbets, who had by now accumulated an 80% share of the club. The new combined team was dubbed the Brooklyn Superbas by the press (inspired by the popular circus act The Hanlons' Superba) and would become the champions of the National League in 1899 and again in 1900.

Nicknames
The name Brooklyn Trolley Dodgers was first used to describe the team in 1895. The nickname was still new enough in September 1895 that a newspaper reported that "'Trolley Dodgers' is the new name which eastern baseball cranks [fans] have given the Brooklyn club." In 1895, Brooklyn played at Eastern Park, bounded by Eastern Parkway (now Pitkin Avenue), Powell Street, Sutter Avenue, Van Sinderen Street, where they had moved early in the 1891 season when the second Washington Park burned down.

Some sources erroneously report that the name "Trolley Dodgers" referred to pedestrians avoiding fast cars on street car tracks that bordered Eastern Park on two sides. However, Eastern Park was not bordered by street-level trolley lines that had to be "dodged" by pedestrians. The name "Trolley Dodgers" implied the dangers posed by trolley cars in Brooklyn generally, which in 1892, began the switch from horse-power to electrical power, which made them much faster, and were hence regarded as more dangerous. The name was later shortened to Brooklyn Dodgers.

Other team names used to refer to the franchise that finally came to be called "the Dodgers" were the Atlantics (1884, not directly related to the earlier Brooklyn Atlantics), Bridegrooms or Grooms (1888–1898), Ward's Wonders, the Superbas (1899–1910), and the Robins (1914–1931). All of these nicknames were used by fans and newspaper sports writers to describe the team, often concurrently, but not in any official capacity. The team's legal name was the Brooklyn Base Ball Club. 

The "Trolley Dodgers" nickname was used throughout this period, along with other nicknames, by fans and sports writers of the day. The team did not use the name in a formal sense until 1916, when the name was printed on home World Series programs. The word "Dodgers" appeared on team jerseys in 1932. The "conclusive shift" came in 1933, when both home and road jerseys for the team bore the name "Dodgers".

Examples of how the many popularized names of the team were used interchangeably are available from newspaper articles from the period before 1932. A New York Times article describing a game the Dodgers played in 1916 starts out by referring to how "Jimmy Callahan, pilot of the Pirates, did his best to wreck the hopes the Dodgers have of gaining the National League pennant", but then goes on to comment, "the only thing that saved the Superbas from being toppled from first place was that the Phillies lost one of the two games played." 

Most baseball statistics sites and baseball historians generally now refer to the pennant-winning 1916 Brooklyn team as the Robins; on the other hand, the Brooklyn Daily Eagle used "Superbas" in its box scores that season. A 1918 New York Times article used the nickname Robins in its title "Buccaneers Take Last From Robins", but the subtitle of the article reads "Subdue The Superbas By 11 To 4, Making Series An Even Break". Space-conscious headline writers still used "the Flock" (derived from "Robins") during the Dodgers' last decade in Brooklyn.

Another example of the interchangeability of different nicknames is found on the program issued at Ebbets Field for the 1920 World Series, which identifies the matchup in the series as "Dodgers vs. Indians", despite the fact that the Robins nickname had been in consistent usage at this point for around six years.

Rivalry with the Giants

The historic and heated rivalry between the Dodgers and the Giants is more than a century old. It began when the Dodgers and Giants faced each other in the 1889 World Series, the ancestor of the Subway Series, and both played in separate, neighboring cities. Brooklyn and New York were separate cities until 1898, when they became neighboring boroughs of the newly expanded New York City. When both franchises moved to California after the 1957 season, the rivalry was easily transplanted, as the cities of Los Angeles and San Francisco have long been economic, political, and cultural rivals, representative of the broader Southern/Northern California divide.

"Uncle Robbie" and the "Daffiness Boys"
Manager Wilbert Robinson, another former Oriole, popularly known as "Uncle Robbie", restored the Brooklyn team to respectability. His "Brooklyn Robins" reached the 1916 and 1920 World Series, losing both, but contending perennially for several seasons. Charles Ebbets and Ed McKeever died within a week of each other in 1925, and Robbie was named president while still field manager. Upon assuming the title of president, however, Robinson's ability to focus on the field declined, and the teams of the late 1920s were often fondly referred to as the "Daffiness Boys" for their distracted, error-ridden style of play. 

Outfielder Babe Herman was the leader both in hitting and in zaniness. The signature Dodger play from this era occurred when three players – Dazzy Vance, Chick Fewster, and Herman – ended up at third base at the same time. The play is often remembered as Herman "tripling into a triple play", though only two of the three players were declared out and Herman was credited with a double rather than a triple. Herman later complained that no one remembered that he drove in the winning run on the play. The incident led to the popular joke:
"The Dodgers have three men on base!"
"Oh, yeah? Which base?"

After his removal as club president, Robinson returned to managing, and the club's performance rebounded somewhat.

When Robinson retired in 1931, he was replaced as manager by Max Carey. Although some suggested renaming the "Robins" the "Brooklyn Canaries", after Carey, whose last name was originally "Carnarius", the name "Brooklyn Dodgers" returned to stay following Robinson's retirement. It was during this era that Willard Mullin, a noted sports cartoonist, fixed the Brooklyn team with the lovable nickname of "Dem Bums". After hearing his cab driver ask, "So how did those bums do today?", Mullin decided to sketch an exaggerated version of famed circus clown Emmett Kelly to represent the Dodgers in his much-praised cartoons in the New York World-Telegram. Both image and nickname caught on, so much so that many a Dodger yearbook cover, from 1951 through 1957, featured a Willard Mullin illustration of the Brooklyn Bum.

Perhaps the highlight of the Daffiness Boys era came after Wilbert Robinson left the dugout. In 1934, Giants player/manager Bill Terry was asked about the Dodgers’ chances in the coming pennant race and cracked infamously, "Is Brooklyn still in the league?" Managed then by Casey Stengel, who played for the Dodgers in the 1910s and went on to greatness managing the New York Yankees, the 1934 Dodgers were determined to make their presence felt. As it happened, the season entered its final games with the Giants tied with the St. Louis Cardinals for the pennant, with the Giants’ remaining games against the Dodgers. Stengel led his Bums to the Polo Grounds for the showdown, and they beat the Giants twice to knock them out of the pennant race. The "Gashouse Gang" Cardinals nailed the pennant by beating the Cincinnati Reds those same two days.

One key development during this era was the 1938 appointment of Leland "Larry" MacPhail as Dodgers' general manager. MacPhail, who brought night games to Major League Baseball as general manager of the Reds, also started night baseball in Brooklyn and ordered the successful refurbishing of Ebbets Field. He also brought Reds voice Red Barber to Brooklyn as the Dodgers' lead announcer in 1939, just after MacPhail broke the New York baseball executives' agreement to ban live baseball broadcasts, enacted because of the fear of the effect of radio calls on the home teams' attendance.

MacPhail remained with the Dodgers until 1942, when he returned to the Armed Forces for World War II. He later became one of the Yankees' co-owners, bidding unsuccessfully for Barber to join him in the Bronx as announcer.

The first major-league baseball game to be televised was Brooklyn's 6–1 victory over Cincinnati at Ebbets Field on August 26, 1939. Batting helmets were introduced to Major League Baseball by the Dodgers in 1941.

Breaking the color barrier

For most of the first half of the 20th century, no Major League Baseball team employed a black player. A parallel system of Negro leagues developed, but most of the Negro league players were denied a chance to prove their skill before a national audience. Jackie Robinson became the first African-American to play Major League baseball in the 20th century when he played his first major league game on April 15, 1947, as a member of the Brooklyn Dodgers. Robinson's entry into the league was mainly due to General Manager Branch Rickey's efforts.

The deeply religious Rickey's motivation appears to have been primarily moral, although business considerations were also present. Rickey was a member of the Methodist Church, the antecedent denomination to the United Methodist Church of today, which was a strong advocate for social justice and active later in the Civil Rights Movement. Rickey saw his opportunity with the 1944 death of Commissioner Kenesaw Mountain Landis, an arch-segregationist and enforcer of the color barrier.

Besides selecting Robinson for his exceptional baseball skills, Rickey also considered Robinson's outstanding personal character, his UCLA education and rank of captain in the U.S. Army in his decision, since he knew that boos, taunts, and criticism were going to be directed at Robinson, and that Robinson had to be tough enough to withstand abuse without attempting to retaliate.

The inclusion of Robinson on the team also led the Dodgers to move its spring training site. Prior to 1946, the Dodgers held their spring training in Jacksonville, Florida. However, the city's stadium refused to host an exhibition game with the Montreal Royals – the Dodgers’ own farm club – on whose roster Robinson appeared at the time, citing segregation laws. Nearby Sanford similarly declined. Ultimately, City Island Ballpark in Daytona Beach agreed to host the game with Robinson on the field. The team traveled to Havana, Cuba for spring training in 1947, this time with Robinson on the big club. Although the Dodgers ultimately built Dodgertown and its Holman Stadium further south in Vero Beach, and played there for 61 spring training seasons from 1948 through 2008, Daytona Beach renamed City Island Ballpark to Jackie Robinson Ballpark in his honor.

This event marked the continuation of the integration of professional sports in the United States, with professional football having led the way in 1946, with the concomitant demise of the Negro leagues, and is regarded as a key moment in the history of the American civil rights movement. Robinson was an exceptional player, a speedy runner who sparked the team with his intensity. He was the inaugural recipient of the Rookie of the Year award, which is now named the Jackie Robinson award in his honor. The Dodgers' willingness to integrate, when most other teams refused to, was a key factor in their 1947–1956 success. They won six pennants in those 10 years with the help of Robinson, three-time MVP Roy Campanella, Cy Young Award winner Don Newcombe, Jim Gilliam, and Joe Black. Robinson eventually became the first African-American elected to the Baseball Hall of Fame in 1962.

"Wait ’til next year!"
After the wilderness years of the 1920s and 1930s, the Dodgers were rebuilt into a contending club first by general manager Larry MacPhail and then the legendary Branch Rickey.
The annual ritual of building excitement, followed in the end by disappointment, became a common pattern to the long suffering fans, and "Wait ’til next year!" became an unofficial Dodger slogan.

While the Dodgers generally enjoyed success during this period, in  they fell victim to one of the largest collapses in the history of baseball. On August 11, 1951, Brooklyn led the National League by an enormous  games over their archrivals, the Giants. While the Dodgers went 26–22 from that time until the end of the season, the Giants went on an absolute tear, winning an amazing 37 of their last 44 games, including their last seven in a row. At the end of the season the Dodgers and the Giants were tied for first place, forcing a three-game playoff for the pennant. 

The Giants took Game 1 by a score of 3–1 before being shut out by the Dodgers' Clem Labine in Game 2, 10–0. It all came down to the final game, and Brooklyn seemed to have the pennant locked up, holding a 4–2 lead in the bottom of the ninth inning. Giants outfielder Bobby Thomson, however, hit a stunning three-run walk-off home run off the Dodgers' Ralph Branca to secure the NL Championship for New York. To this day Thomson's home run is known as the Shot Heard 'Round The World.

In 1955, by which time the core of the Dodger team was beginning to age, "next year" finally came. The fabled "Boys of Summer" shot down the "Bronx Bombers" in seven games, led by the first-class pitching of young left-hander Johnny Podres, whose key pitch was a changeup known as "pulling down the lampshade" because of the arm motion used right when the ball was released. Podres won two Series games, including the deciding seventh. The turning point of Game 7 was a spectacular double play that began with left fielder Sandy Amorós running down Yogi Berra's long fly ball, then throwing to shortstop Pee Wee Reese, who relayed to first baseman Gil Hodges to double up a surprised Gil McDougald to preserve the Dodger lead. Hank Bauer grounded out and the Dodgers won 2–0.

Although the Dodgers lost the World Series to the Yankees in  during which the Yankees pitcher Don Larsen pitched the only World Series perfect game in baseball history and the only post-season no-hitter for the next 54 years, it hardly seemed to matter. Brooklyn fans had their memory of triumph, and soon that was all they were left with – a victory that was remembered decades later in the Billy Joel single "We Didn't Start the Fire", which included the line, "Brooklyn's got a winning team."

Move to California

Real estate businessman Walter O'Malley had acquired majority ownership of the Dodgers in 1950, when he bought Rickey's 25 percent share of the team and secured the support of the widow of another equal partner, John L. Smith. Soon O'Malley was working to buy new land in Brooklyn for a new, more accessible and better ballpark than Ebbets Field. Beloved as it was, Ebbets Field had grown old and was not well served by infrastructure, to the point where the Dodgers could not "sell out" the park to maximum capacity even in the heat of a pennant race, despite dominating the league from 1946 to 1957.

New York City Construction Coordinator Robert Moses sought to force O'Malley into using a site in Flushing Meadows, Queens – the eventual location of Shea Stadium (which opened in 1964), the home of the future New York Mets, who began play in 1962. Moses' vision involved a city-built, city-owned park, which was greatly at odds with O'Malley's real-estate savvy. When O'Malley realized that he was not going to be allowed to buy a suitable parcel of land in Brooklyn, he began thinking of moving the team.

O'Malley was free to purchase land of his own choosing, but wanted Robert Moses to condemn a parcel of land along the Atlantic Railroad Yards in downtown Brooklyn under Title I authority, after O'Malley had bought the bulk of the land he had in mind. Title I gave the city municipality power to condemn land for the purpose of building what it calls "public purpose" projects. Moses' interpretation of "public purpose" included public parks, public housing and public highways and bridges.

What O'Malley wanted was for Moses to use Title I authority, rather than to pay market value for the land. With Title I the city via Robert Moses could have sold the land to O'Malley at a below market price. Moses refused to honor O'Malley's request and responded, "If you want the land so bad, why don't you purchase it with your own money?".

Meanwhile, non-stop transcontinental airline travel had become routine during the years since the Second World War. Teams were no longer bound by much slower railroad timetables. Because of civil aviation advances, it became possible to locate teams farther apart – as far west as California – while maintaining the same busy game schedules.

When Los Angeles officials attended the 1956 World Series looking to entice a team to move there, they were not even thinking of the Dodgers. Their original target had been the Washington Senators franchise, which eventually moved to Bloomington, Minnesota to become the Minnesota Twins in 1961. At the same time, O'Malley was looking for a contingency in case Moses and other New York politicians refused to let him build the Brooklyn stadium he wanted, and sent word to the Los Angeles officials that he was interested in talking. Los Angeles offered him what New York did not: a chance to buy land suitable for building a ballpark, and own that ballpark, giving him complete control over all its revenue streams. At the same time, the National League was not willing to approve the Dodgers' move unless O'Malley found a second team willing to join them out west, largely out of concern for travel costs.

Meanwhile, Giants owner Horace Stoneham was having similar difficulty finding a replacement for his team's antiquated home stadium, the Polo Grounds. Stoneham was considering moving the Giants to Minneapolis, but was persuaded instead to move them to San Francisco, ensuring that the Dodgers had a National League rival closer than St. Louis. So the two arch-rival teams, the Dodgers and Giants, moved out to the West Coast together after the 1957 season.

The Brooklyn Dodgers played their final game at Ebbets Field on September 24, 1957, which the Dodgers won 2–0 over the Pittsburgh Pirates.

On April 18, 1958, the Los Angeles Dodgers played their first game in L.A., defeating the former New York and newly moved and renamed San Francisco Giants, 6–5, before 78,672 fans at the Los Angeles Memorial Coliseum. Catcher Roy Campanella, left partially paralyzed in an off-season automobile accident on January 28, 1958, was never able to play for the Dodgers in Los Angeles.

A 2007 HBO film, Brooklyn Dodgers: The Ghosts of Flatbush, is a documentary covering the Dodgers history from early days to the beginning of the Los Angeles era. In the film, the story is related that O'Malley was so hated by Brooklyn Dodger fans after the move to California, that it was said: "If you asked a Brooklyn Dodger fan, if you had a gun with only two bullets in it and were in a room with Hitler, Stalin, and O'Malley, who would you shoot? The answer: O'Malley, twice!"

Notes

References

Further reading

 
 

	

Brooklyn Dodgers
Brooklyn Dodgers
Jackie Robinson
Defunct baseball teams in New York (state)
Baseball teams disestablished in 1957
Baseball teams established in 1883
Los Angeles Dodgers